Princess Athena can refer to:
 HH Princess Athena of Denmark (born 2012), the youngest child of Prince Joachim and Princess Marie of Denmark
 The protagonist of the video game Athena